Joe Kruzel (born December 17, 1965) is an American baseball coach and former player. In 2021 Joe managed the Billings Mustangs, of the Pioneer League. In 2022 he was named the Field Coordinator for the Los Angeles Angels organization. Kruzel served as the head baseball coach at his alma mater, The University of Toledo from 1993 to 2003, compiling a record of 259–331. Kruzel won the Mid-American Conference Coach of the Year award in 1999.

Early life
Kruzel was born in Toledo, Ohio and attended Central Catholic High School. He played college baseball at the University of Toledo.

References

External links
 

1965 births
Living people
Baseball infielders
Billings Mustangs managers
Miami RedHawks baseball coaches
Toledo Rockets baseball coaches
Toledo Rockets baseball players